Secret Venture is a 1955 British B-movie thriller film directed by R. G. Springsteen and starring Kent Taylor, Jane Hylton and Kathleen Byron.

Plot
Renowned scientist Professor Henrik (Hugo Schuster) returns to England from a working trip overseas and is met by his glamorous secretary Joan (Hylton).  American Ted O'Hara (Taylor) has come in on the same flight and in the bustle of the airport he and Henrik mistakenly pick up each other's identical briefcases, and O'Hara innocently departs with a briefcase containing a top-secret formula for a revolutionary new type of jet fuel.

Later, Henrik is abducted by a group headed by a sinister man named Zelinsky (Karel Štěpánek), who are eager to lay their hands on the formula.  They are furious to find that Henrik's briefcase contains nothing more than the everyday bits and pieces of a man called O'Hara.  They detail one of their number, the sultry Renée (Byron), to track down O'Hara and gain his confidence.  This she does, then a henchman appears and forcibly takes the puzzled O'Hara to the headquarters of the Zelinsky operation.  They tell him that he has Henrik's briefcase, which he had not previously known, and that they are prepared to pay handsomely if he passes it over.

Rather than cash in on this unexpected turn of events, O'Hara goes to Scotland Yard.  He says that he heard Zelinsky mention the name Weber, apparently an espionage agent in Paris.  The inspector briefs O'Hara to go to Paris and make contact with Weber.  O'Hara is followed by Renée and a cohort, who manage to steal the briefcase during the journey.  O'Hara finds Weber (Frederick Valk) in Paris, and learns that he now has the briefcase in his possession but is unable to decipher the contents which appear to be written in a complex code.

O'Hara returns to London and explains the situation to Scotland Yard.  Not wanting to jeopardise Henrik's safety, the police suggest he should make contact with Joan, who seems the most likely to have the necessary information.  O'Hara shadows her waiting for a moment to make unobtrusive contact, but before he can do so he is shocked to see her rendezvous with a member of the Zelinsky gang and hand over some documents to him.  The scene is set, as O'Hara and the police try to establish whether the apparently innocent Joan has in fact betrayed Henrik and been a prime mover in the plot all along.

Cast
 Kent Taylor as Ted O'Hara
 Jane Hylton as Joan Butler
 Kathleen Byron as Renée l'Epinal
 Karel Štěpánek as Zelinsky
 Frederick Valk as Otto Weber
 Maurice Kaufmann as Dan Fleming
 Martin Boddey as Squire Marlowe
 Arthur Lane as Bob Hendon
 Hugo Schuster as Professor Henrik
 John Boxer as Inspector Dalton
 Michael Ripper as Bill Rymer

External links 
 
 Secret Venture at BFI Film & TV Database

1955 films
1950s thriller films
British thriller films
British black-and-white films
Films directed by R. G. Springsteen
Films set in London
Republic Pictures films
1950s English-language films
1950s British films